Dalan is a town located in Luxi County in Xiangxi, Hunan, China..

References

Luxi, Hunan
Towns of Hunan